Jan Vittorio Sardi  (born 1953) is an Australian screenwriter. In 1997, he was nominated for an Academy Award for Best Writing (Original Screenplay), for Shine. He wrote and directed the 2004 film Love's Brother. He adapted the novel by Nicholas Sparks for The Notebook (2004). Sardi also adapted Li Cunxin's memoir for the film Mao's Last Dancer (2009) and the mini-series The Secret River (co-written with Mac Gudgeon), based on the novel by Kate Grenville.

References

External links

1953 births
Australian screenwriters
Living people
Officers of the Order of Australia